Abi Smith (born 1 April 2002) is a Scottish born English international cyclist. She has represented England at the Commonwealth Games.

Biography
Smith, originally a triathlete was first selected for the GB cycling team in 2018. She joined EF Education-TIBCO-SVB from Clifton Cycling Club.

In 2022, she was selected for the 2022 Commonwealth Games in Birmingham. She competed in the women's road race and the women's road time trial.

References

2002 births
Living people
British female cyclists
Cyclists at the 2022 Commonwealth Games
Commonwealth Games competitors for England